Wolica  is a village in the administrative district of Gmina Kraśniczyn, within Krasnystaw County, Lublin Voivodeship, in eastern Poland.

In 2005 the village had a population of 140.

References
Gmina Kraśniczyn official website

Wolica